Gem Keeper is an iOS game developed by NCSOFT and released on October 14, 2011.

Critical reception
The game has a Metacritic rating of 84% based on 5 critic reviews.

Touch Arcade wrote " Simply a stunner in both execution and gameplay, and I cannot recommend it highly enough. " 148Apps said " For a newcomer to tower defense games, Gem Keepers is the perfect place to start. For those who already love the genre, Gem Keepers is a no-brainer. Get it. " AppSafari wrote " Worth the money, trust me. Designed for both the iPhone and iPad , Gem Keeper has the potential to provide hours of fun. " AppSpy said " It's great to see a powerhouse like NCsoft taking the plunge in to the App Store, but Gem Keeper feels like a safe gamble with the moveable tower system not really being explored. " Pocket Gamer UK wrote " Gem Keeper's wonderful presentation and rock-solid fundamentals are undermined by a difficulty level that veers all over the place, but this is still a polished and enjoyable tower defence experience. "

References

2011 video games
Android (operating system) games
IOS games
Tower defense video games
Video games developed in South Korea